This is a list of survivors of assassination attempts, listed chronologically. It does not include those who were heads of state or government at the time of the assassination attempt. See List of heads of state and government who survived assassination attempts.

List

Gallery

See also

 List of assassinations
 List of heads of state and government who survived assassination attempts

Notes and references

Assassination attempts
Assassination attempts, survived
 
Survivors